Oxytrigona is a genus of bees belonging to the family Apidae.

The species of this genus are found in Southern America.

Species:

Oxytrigona chocoana 
Oxytrigona daemoniaca 
Oxytrigona flaveola 
Oxytrigona huaoranii 
Oxytrigona ignis 
Oxytrigona isthmina 
Oxytrigona mediorufa 
Oxytrigona mellicolor 
Oxytrigona mulfordi 
Oxytrigona obscura 
Oxytrigona tataira

References

Meliponini
Hymenoptera genera